Wellstead Estuary is an estuarine inlet in the Great Southern region of Western Australia.

The estuary is wave dominated and functions primarily as a result of wave energy, both the estuary and the catchment are in a modified condition.

The sandbar across the mouth of the inlet only opens after heavy rain events and was once closed for over 20 years. The estuary is not eutrophic as a result of the prolific population of the seagrass Ruppia megacarpa and the low levels of nutrients that flow into the estuary.

The town of Bremer Bay is located along the shoreline of the estuary.

References

External links

Estuaries of Western Australia
Great Southern (Western Australia)
South coast of Western Australia